Showdown in the Sun was a professional wrestling pay-per-view (PPV) event produced by Ring of Honor (ROH) that took place over two consecutive days: Friday, March 30 and Saturday, March 31, 2012 at the War Memorial Auditorium in Fort Lauderdale, Florida.

All three of Ring of Honor's championships were defended throughout the course of the weekend. The ROH World Championship was defended in a three-way match between champion Davey Richards, his former tag team partner Eddie Edwards and their mutual long-term rival Roderick Strong. All three wrestlers were scheduled for a "Blind Destiny" match on the second day, with the winner having to defend the championship against their respective opponent: Michael Elgin, Kevin Steen and Jay Lethal. ROH World Television Champion Jay Lethal defended his title against Kyle O'Reilly on the first day, while the ROH World Tag Team Championship were defended on the second day, by the Briscoe Brothers (Jay and Mark) against former champions Wrestling's Greatest Tag Team (Charlie Haas and Shelton Benjamin). Also on the card, the Young Bucks (Nick and Matt Jackson) faced the All Night Express (Kenny King and Rhett Titus) in tag team matches on both nights, with differing stipulations.

Guest competitors not contracted to Ring of Honor also wrestled in matches over the weekend, most notably former WWE, World Championship Wrestling, and Extreme Championship Wrestling star Lance Storm, former ROH star and (at the time) NWA World Heavyweight Champion Adam Pearce, and Fire Ant, who was representing the Chikara promotion (with whom ROH has a talent exchange agreement).

Technical issues 
Viewers watching the show via internet pay-per-view through GoFightLive.tv suffered numerous technical issues during the show. During the showdown between former Future Shock partners, Adam Cole and Kyle O'Reilly, the stream went dead and officials began trying to fix the problem while O'Reilly and Cole made impromptu speeches to delay the show. When it became apparent the technical issues with the stream wouldn't be immediately solved, the match continued as originally planned. Other segments were also not aired live due to these technical faults.

ROH posted the matches on their official YouTube channel and have since stopped promoting their iPPVs through GoFightLive.tv. From the following iPPV, Border Wars, ROH began airing the events on their website.

Results

See also
2012 in professional wrestling
List of Ring of Honor pay-per-view events

References

External links

 

Ring of Honor pay-per-view events
Events in Florida
2012 in professional wrestling in Florida
Professional wrestling in Florida
March 2012 events in the United States
2012 Ring of Honor pay-per-view events